Anthony Michael Sherman (born December 11, 1988) is a former American football fullback. He spent the majority of his career with the Kansas City Chiefs of the National Football League (NFL). He was drafted by the Arizona Cardinals in the fifth round of the 2011 NFL Draft. He played college football at the University of Connecticut (UConn). His nickname is "Sausage".

Early years
Sherman attended North Attleboro High School in North Attleboro, Massachusetts, where he was the team captain in football, track, and baseball. He was named the Massachusetts Gatorade Player of the Year in 2006. He was named thrice to the Attleboro Sun-Chronicle All-Star team. In football, he rushed for 1,202 yards and 20 touchdowns as a senior, while also adding 100 tackles on defense. He is the school's career leader in rushing yards (2,537) and touchdowns (48). In baseball, he was a two-time All-League selection.

In track & field, Sherman served as the team captain and competed in the sprinting and throwing events. In sprints, he recorded times of 6.98 seconds in the 55-meter dash and 12.19 seconds in the 100-meter dash. As a thrower, he competed in the shot put and got a top-throw of 15.48 meters.

Coming out of high school, Sherman was rated a 3-star recruit by Rivals and 247 Sports. He received only two Division 1 scholarship offers, from UConn and Boston College. He ultimately decided to commit to play for the University of Connecticut on February 7, 2007.

College career
As a freshman in 2007, Sherman immediately became the starting fullback for the UConn Huskies and was the lead blocker for Donald Brown, the 2008 Big East Offensive Player of the Year.

As a sophomore in 2008, Sherman had his best year statistically. He had three carries for 9 yards, had 26 receptions for 270 yards, and 13 tackles on special teams.

In his junior and senior seasons, Sherman was elected team captain and was the lead blocker for fellow Massachusetts native, Jordan Todman, who was the 2010 Big East Offensive Player of the Year and an ESPN All-American. Sherman scored his first collegiate touchdown during his senior season.

During his collegiate career, Sherman rushed for 61 yards on 17 carries, caught 48 passes for 477 yards and a touchdown, and had 63 total tackles.

Professional career

Arizona Cardinals
Sherman was drafted by the Arizona Cardinals in the fifth round, 136th overall, of the 2011 NFL Draft. In his rookie season, he had eight receptions for 72 yards. In the 2012 season, he had five receptions for 39 yards.

Kansas City Chiefs
Sherman was traded to the Kansas City Chiefs on May 1, 2013 in exchange for cornerback Javier Arenas. On October 27, 2013, Sherman caught a touchdown pass from Alex Smith against the Cleveland Browns. Overall, he finished the 2013 season with 18 receptions for 155 yards and a touchdown. In the Wild Card Round against the Indianapolis Colts, he recorded a five-yard receiving touchdown in the 45–44 loss. Sherman signed a contract extension with the Chiefs on November 5, 2014. Overall, he finished the 2014 season with 10 receptions for 71 yards and a touchdown.  In the 2015 season, he only had four receptions for 34 yards but did appear in all 16 games.

In the 2016 season, Sherman appeared in all 16 games, of which he started three. He totaled  four receptions for 11 yards. On September 17, 2017, in Week 2 against the Philadelphia Eagles, he recovered a fumble on a Darren Sproles punt return.  In the last week of the 2017 season, Sherman scored his first rushing touchdown of his NFL career. He scored up the middle against the Denver Broncos on a 14-carry, 40-yard performance. Overall, he finished the 2017 season with six receptions for 40 yards in addition to the 14 carries for 40 yards.

On March 12, 2018, Sherman signed a one-year contract extension with the Chiefs. In the Chiefs' 2018 season opener against the Los Angeles Chargers, he recorded a 36-yard receiving touchdown in the 38–28 victory.

On March 22, 2019, Sherman signed a one-year $1.02 million contract extension with the Chiefs, and won an NFL championship in Super Bowl LIV with the team.

On April 6, 2020, Sherman signed a one-year contract with the Chiefs. Following the release of long-time Chiefs punter Dustin Colquitt in the 2020 offseason, Sherman became tied with Travis Kelce and Eric Fisher as the longest tenured members of the Chiefs. On October 13, 2020, he was placed on the reserve/COVID-19 list after being exposed to someone who tested positive for COVID-19. He would eventually test positive himself. He was activated on November 4.

Sherman announced his retirement on March 4, 2021.

NFL career statistics

Regular season

Postseason

Personal life
Sherman is married to Jessica Sherman. They have three children together. Sherman is a Christian.

Sherman and his wife, Jessica, have partnered with the child sponsorship and Christian humanitarian aid organization Compassion International for various initiatives.

Controversy
When speaking on the NFL's requirements for players during the 2021 season for players not vaccinated against COVID-19, Sherman generated controversy. The league had required unvaccinated players to wear a wristband. Those wristbands, Sherman compared to segregation on his Twitter account. He tweeted "The @NFL is making players wear colored wrist bands now based on vaccination status. Funny, I thought we all agreed on the evils of segregation back in the 60s. Here we are again- only this time it’s based on personal health choices instead of skin color". He followed that tweet up with another one saying "The league clearly values being woke, not awake. What a shame. And what a sham". The tweets received primarily mixed reactions.

References

External links

Connecticut Huskies bio 

1988 births
Living people
People from North Attleborough, Massachusetts
Players of American football from Massachusetts
American football fullbacks
UConn Huskies football players
Arizona Cardinals players
Kansas City Chiefs players
American Conference Pro Bowl players